Murak may refer to:
 Murak, Isfahan
 Murak, Buin va Miandasht, Isfahan Province
 Murak, Vardasht, Isfahan Province